Vestfonna is an ice cap located on the western part Nordaustlandet in the Svalbard archipelago in Norway. The glacier covers an area of about 2,500 km2. It is the third largest ice cap in Svalbard and Norway by area, after Austfonna and Olav V Land.

See also
 List of glaciers
 List of glaciers in Norway

References

Glaciers of Svalbard
Nordaustlandet